Bank Error in Your Favour is a 2009 French comedy film directed by Gérard Bitton and Michel Munz.

Cast 
 Gérard Lanvin - Julien Foucault
 Jean-Pierre Darroussin - Étienne
 Barbara Schulz - Stéphanie
  - Baudoin
  - Gilbert
 Jennifer Decker - Harmony
 Éric Berger - Alban 
  - Du Rouvre
  - Bergstein
  - Martinez
 Roger Dumas - Lebrun
 Laurent Gamelon - Georges
 Marie-Christine Adam - Mme Brière
 Martin Lamotte - Antoine

References

External links 

2009 comedy films
2009 films
French comedy films
2000s French films